At the Supper Club Part III is a 2011 album release of recordings by the American singer Jo Stafford. The tracks are taken from her appearances on The Chesterfield Supper Club, the NBC variety program of the 1940s. The recordings on this compilation were made with Lloyd Shafer and His Orchestra, Paul Weston and His Orchestra, Helen Carroll and the Satisfiers, and The Starlighters. Martin Block is the Master Of Ceremonies.

Track listing
 All The Things You Are (Orchestral Introduction)
 It's Only A Paper Moon
 Come Back To Sorrento
 My Guys Come Back
 Tampico
 Give Me The Simple Life
 Thou Swell
 I'm Always Chasing Rainbows
 Catfish, Take A Look A That Worm
 Tumblin' Tumbleweeds
 Storybook Romance
 Ol' Man River
 When Your Lover Has Gone
 I May Be Wrong
 I Don't Know Enough About You
 You Always Hurt The One You Love
 Sometimes I'm Happy
 Love Is So Terrific
 Smoke Dreams
 'S Wonderful
 Poor Butterfly
 Girls Were Made To Take Care Of Boys
 Buttons And Bows
 The Merry-Go-Round Broke Down
 One Mornin'''
 Medley: Smoke Dreams/These Foolish Things Smoke Dreams Always True To You In My Fashion He's Gone Away Medley: Sleepy Time Down South/Memphis Blues Powder Your Face With Sunshine Smoke Dreams''

References

External links
At the Supper Club Part III at Worldrecords.com

Compilation albums published posthumously
Jo Stafford compilation albums
2011 compilation albums